Kitsuné Maison Compilation 3 is the third compilation released by the French label Kitsuné Music. It was released on 11 December 2006. Pitchfork Media gave the album a mixed 6.0/10 review, describing the tracks by Simian Mobile Disco, Freeform Five and The Whitest Boy Alive as highlights.

Track listing
 Simian Mobile Disco – "I Believe"
 The Lovely Feathers – "Frantic"
 The Whip – "Trash"
 Fox n' Wolf – "Youth Alcoholic"
 Klaxons – "Gravity's Rainbow (Van She Remix)"
 Freeform Five – "Home Wit U"
 Boys Noize – "Feel Good (TV=Off)"
 Gossip – "Standing In The Way Of Control (Soulwax Nite Version)"
 Alex Gopher – "Motorcycle (Wet Clutch Short Edit)"
 The World Domination vs. Adam Sky – "Galactic Lover"
 Dead Disco – "The Treatment (Metronomy Remix)"
 The Valentinos – "Kafka (Bag Raiders What Y'all Kno 'Bout Seven Remix)"
 Oh No! Oh My! – "I Love You All The Time"
 The Whitest Boy Alive – "Done With You"
 Digitalism – "Zdarlight (Paranoid Asteroid Mix)"

References

Kitsuné compilation albums
2006 compilation albums